The Elko Hills are a mountain range in Elko County, in the northeastern section of the state of Nevada in the Great Basin region of the western United States. Elko Mountain, the range high-point, and Grindstone Mountain are the range's only named summits.

References

Mountain ranges of Nevada
Mountain ranges of the Great Basin
Mountain ranges of Elko County, Nevada